Dorrite is a silicate mineral that is isostructural to the aenigmatite group. Although it is most chemically similar to the mineral rhönite [Ca2Mg5Ti(Al2Si4)O20], the lack of titanium (Ti) and presence of Fe3+ influenced dorrite's independence. Dorrite is named for Dr. John (Jack) A. Dorr, a late professor at the University of Michigan that researched in outcrops where dorrite was found in 1982. This mineral is sub-metallic resembling colors of brownish-black, dark brown, to reddish brown.

Discovery
Dorrite was first reported in 1982 by A. Havette in a basalt-limestone contact on Réunion Island off of the coast of Africa. The second report of dorrite was made by Franklin Foit and his associates while examining a paralava from the Powder River Basin, Wyoming in 1987. Analyses determined that this newly found mineral was surprisingly similar to the mineral rhönite, lacking Ti but presenting dominant Fe3+ in its octahedral sites. Other minerals that coexist with this phase are plagioclase, gehlenite-akermanite, magnetite-magnesioferrite-spinel solid solutions, esseneite, nepheline, wollastonite, Ba-rich feldspar, apatite, ulvöspinel, ferroan sahamalite, and secondary barite, and calcite.

Occurrence
Dorrite can be found in mineral reactions that relate dorrite + magnetite + clinopyroxene, rhönite + magnetite + olivine + clinopyroxene, and aenigmatite + pyroxene + olivine assemblages in nature.  These assemblages favor low pressures and high temperatures. Dorrite is stable in strongly oxidizing, high-temperature, low-pressure environments. It occurs in paralava, pyrometamorphic melt rock, formed from the burning of coal beds.

Crystallography
Researchers conclusively determined that dorrite is triclinic-pseudomonoclinic and twinned by a twofold rotation about the pseudomonoclinic b axis. The parameters for dorrite are a=10.505, b=10.897, c=9.019 Å, α=106.26°, β=95.16°, γ=124.75°.

Chemical Composition
Calcium 8.97%Magnesium 5.44%Aluminum 6.04%Iron 37.48%Silicon 6.28%Oxygen 35.79%

Oxides
CaO 12.55%MgO 9.02%Al2O3 11.41%Fe2O3 53.59%SiO2 13.44%

References

Natural materials
Inosilicates
Triclinic minerals